Leningrad Symphony is a 1957 drama film directed by .

Plot 
In the summer of 1942, Shostakovich's Seventh Symphony was brought to the Radio House, but the orchestra didn't have enough musicians to perform it. However, on August 9, when Hitler planned to seize Leningrad, people heard the Symphony live. This film is a depiction of the events leading up to the day of the historic performance, which was broadcast nationwide all over the Soviet Union on radio, and led up to the smash success of the work at home and abroad.

Cast 
 Vladimir Solovyov as  Loginov
 Mark Pertsovsky as  Orest  Dobroselsky
 Olga Malko as Valentina  Orlova  
 Yelena Stroyeva as Dr. Nadezhda  Volkova  
 Nikolay Kryuchkov as Maj.   Polyakov
 Zhanna Sukhopolskaya as Nina Sergeyevna  
 Maksim Shtraukh as Professor Baghdasarov
 Robert Bushkov as Aleksandr Volkov
 Mikhail Tumanishvili as  Roashkin  
 Yuri Krotenko as Solovyov
 Vladimir Damsky as Tutrovsky
 Sergei Kurilov as Commander Pavel Grigorievich Orlov
 Alla Demidova as student
 Stanislav Lyubshin as student
 Fyodor Nikitin as episode
 Zoya Fyodorova as episode
 Yulian Panich as episode
 Sergey Filippov as episode
 Veronika Buzhinskaya as episode

See also
 Siege of Leningrad
 Symphony No. 7 (Shostakovich)

References

External links 
 

1957 films
1950s Russian-language films
Soviet drama films
Mosfilm films
1957 drama films
Eastern Front of World War II films